Edward F Johnson Airport  is a privately owned public use airport  south of the central business district of Ishpeming, a city in Marquette County, Michigan, United States.

Facilities and aircraft 
For the 12-month period ending December 31, 2017, the airport had 825 aircraft operations, an average of 69 per month: 100% general aviation. In November 2021, there were 4 aircraft based at this airport: 4 single-engine.

References

External links 

Airports in Michigan
Buildings and structures in Marquette County, Michigan
Transportation in Marquette County, Michigan
Airports in the Upper Peninsula of Michigan